Syeda Uzma Qadri is a Pakistani politician who had been a member of the Provincial Assembly of the Punjab between 2013 and 2023

References

Punjab MPAs 2013–2018
Pakistan Muslim League (N) MPAs (Punjab)
People from Lahore
Living people
Women members of the Provincial Assembly of the Punjab
1970 births
21st-century Pakistani women politicians